Duck Dynasty was an American reality television series that aired on A&E from 2012 to 2017. The series portrays the lives of the Robertson family, who became successful from their family-operated business, Duck Commander. The West Monroe, Louisiana business makes products for duck hunters, primarily a duck call called Duck Commander. The Robertson men—brothers Phil and Si, and Phil's sons Alan, Jase, Willie, and Jep—are known for their long beards and their conservative, Evangelical Christian views which is why the show is often considered to be a part of Christian media. The family was previously featured on the series Benelli Presents Duck Commander and its spin-off, Buck Commander, on the Outdoor Channel; Outdoor Channel acquired rerun rights to Duck Dynasty in 2016. In 2020 Fox Nation acquired the streaming rights to the show, a 2022 follow-up series called Duck Family Treasure was released by Fox on Fox Nation as well.

The fourth-season premiere drew 11.8 million viewers; the most-watched nonfiction cable series in history.

The show earned $80 million in advertising sales for the first nine months of 2013, and merchandise has generated another $400 million in revenue.  After 11 seasons, the series concluded on March 29, 2017, with the hour-long finale "End of an Era", the episode concluded with Si Robertson performing the show's theme song "Sharp Dressed Man" alongside ZZ Top.

Duck Dynasty's success launched spin-off series, including Jep & Jessica: Growing the Dynasty and Going Si-Ral. Like past shows, many Robertson family members, co-workers, and friends appear in these spin-offs. Various on-going podcasts continue to prominently feature the Robertsons as well: Phil and Jase host "Unashamed," which is independently produced by Alan; BlazeTV produces the show "In the Woods with Phil"; Sadie hosts "WHOA That's Good Podcast"; and Duck Commander produces "Duck Call Room" with Si, Martin, and Godwin.

Members

Robertson family

Phil Alexander Robertson 

Phil, born , is the family patriarch and creator of the Duck Commander duck call. He was a standout quarterback at Louisiana Tech (actually starting ahead of future Hall of Famer Terry Bradshaw) and was contacted by the Washington Redskins after his junior year. He chose instead to quit football because it interfered with duck hunting season.

Phil graduated from Louisiana Tech with a Bachelor of Arts degree in Physical Education and later received a Masters of Arts degree in Education via night classes while working as a schoolteacher. Phil went through a "dark period" while running a bar that led to his separation from his wife. It was at this low point he reports that he found Christ and reconciled with his wife. It was then that he invented his duck call, and founded the Duck Commander Company in 1973.

Phil is known for his dislike of modern technology, calling himself "a low-tech man in a high-tech world," and his concern that his grandchildren are becoming "yuppies". At the end  of each episode, the family is shown at the dining table, usually with Phil praying over the meal.

Marsha Kay "Miss Kay" Robertson 

Kay Robertson (née Carroway), born , married Phil on January 11, 1966. She is usually addressed as "Miss Kay" by her husband and sons. Kay married Phil at age 15. She is the mother of Alan, Jase, Willie, and Jep.

Phil and Kay's children

Marshal Alan Robertson 
Alan is Phil and Kay's eldest son. He left the family business to become a preacher, but rejoined the family both doing public relations at Duck Commander and appearing on the show since Season 4. He wanted to join the show to spread the Word of God to more people. Alan married Lisa Robertson, (née Gibson) on November 9, 1984, and is the only adult male in the family without a beard.

Alan and Lisa's children

Jason Silas "Jase" Robertson 

Jase is Phil and Miss Kay's second son. He is in charge of the manufacturing aspects at Duck Commander. Along with other employees, Jase tunes the duck calls by hand. He and his wife Missy have three children.

Reed Robertson 
Reed, the eldest child and first son of Jase and Missy, attended Ouachita Christian High School, playing football and baseball. His graduation is shown in Season 6. He is currently attending Harding University, and is married to Brighton Thompson; their wedding is shown in Season 11. He started a music career in Nashville.  In June 2021, it was announced that he and Brighton are expecting a baby girl.

Cole Robertson 
Cole, the second son of Jase and Missy, attended Ouachita Christian High School and played baseball. His graduation is shown in Season 10.

Mia Robertson 
Mia is the youngest child and only daughter of Jase and Missy. She was born with a cleft lip and palate and, as of the end of Season 9, has had six surgeries to correct it.

Willie Jess Robertson 

Willie is Phil and Miss Kay's third son and CEO of Duck Commander. Willie has a bachelor's degree in Health and Human Performance from NE Louisiana University, with an emphasis on Business. He took Duck Commander from a family business to a multimillion-dollar empire. He and his wife Korie have six children.

John Luke Robertson 
John Luke, the son of Willie and Korie, is the second-oldest child of the family after Rebecca. He attended Ouachita Christian High School and later Liberty University. Since summer 2019, John Luke has been the director of Camp Ch-Yo-Ca, a Christian summer camp in Calhoun, Louisiana. In October 2019, he and his wife Mary-Kate welcomed a son, John Shepherd. In April 2021, they announced the birth of their daughter, Ella.

Mary Kate Robertson 
Mary Kate is John Luke's wife. Mary Kate and John Luke were married on June 28, 2015. She also attended Liberty University and studied Women's Leadership.

Sadie Robertson 

Sadie, the daughter of Willie and Korie, attended Ouachita Christian High School. Her graduation is shown in Season 10. Sadie now is an influential speaker and author. She has been married to Christian Huff since November 25, 2019. In 2020, it was announced she was expecting her first child, a girl. On May 11, 2021, she and her husband welcomed a daughter named Honey James Huff.

Bella Robertson 
Youngest daughter of Willie and Korie. In November 2020, at age 18, she became engaged to her boyfriend of 6 months, Jacob Mayo. She married him on June 5, 2021.

Rebecca Robertson 
Rebecca is the foster daughter of Willie and Korie. The family originally hosted Rebecca when she was an exchange student from Taiwan and consider her one of the family. After completing a two-year fashion internship in Southern California, she returned home to West Monroe and opened a clothing boutique. She married John Reed Loflin in Mexico on December 3, 2016. Rebecca and John Reed have a son born on January 11, 2019. They welcomed a daughter on December 24, 2021

Willie Robertson Jr. 
Adopted son of Willie and Korie. The family's first adopted son, "Little Will" joined the Robertsons when he was just five weeks old. Will wasn't a regular on Duck Dynasty, only making occasional appearances on the show, as he's not as involved in the family business as some of his siblings are.

Rowdy Robertson 
Adopted son of Willie and Korie. His adoption is shown being finalized in Season 11.

Jules Jeptha "Jep" Robertson 
Jep is Phil and Miss Kay's youngest son who films and edits DVDs of the Robertson family's duck hunts. He is often seen at Duck Commander and at family dinners. Jep and Jessica have five children. They introduced the newest addition to their family, an adopted son they named Jules Augustus (nicknamed "Gus"), on the premiere of their spin-off series Jep and Jessica: Growing the Dynasty on January 20, 2016, which had an audience of more than two million. The second season premiered on February 22, 2017.

Silas Merritt "Si" Robertson 

Si, born , is Phil's brother, a Vietnam War veteran, and uncle to Phil and Miss Kay's four sons. Si worked at Duck Commander making the reeds that go into every duck call. 

Si also appears in the show's second spin-off Going Si-Ral alongside Willie Robertson where Si studies the Internet.

Other appearances

Recurring 
John Godwin – An employee at Duck Commander since 2002, mainly building duck calls, managing supplies, and overseeing the shipping department as well as being the decoy technician.
Justin Martin – Longtime employee of Duck Commander, mainly building duck calls.
Mountain Man (Tim Guraedy) – A neighbor who operates his own air-conditioning repair business, and co-hosts a local radio talk show on KXKZ.
Jimmy Red (Jimmy Gibson) – An old friend of Phil, Miss Kay, and Si; referred to as "Red" by Phil (five episodes; Seasons 1 and 2)

Non-recurring 
Gordon – Phil's brother-in-law; appeared in the season 5 finale episode "Stand by Mia".

Guest 
 Clint Bowyer – Appeared in the season 2 episode "Drag Me to Glory".
 "Hacksaw" Jim Duggan – Appeared in the season 5 finale episode "Stand by Mia".
 Kurt Angle – Appeared in the season 9 episode "Van He'llsing".

Episodes

Ratings 
An hour-long Christmas special premiered on December 5, 2012 as the Season 2 finale and became (at the time) the most-watched A&E episode in the network's history.

On February 27, 2013, the Season 3 premiere tallied 8.9 million viewers, including five million in the adults 25–54 demographic and five million in adults 18–49 demographic, making the premiere (at the time) the most watched series in network history, beating the Season 2 finale. The one-hour Season 3 finale (shown on April 24, 2013) tallied 9.6 million viewers, with 5.6 million in the Adults 25–54 demographic and 5.5 million in the Adults 18–49 demographic, making it the highest rated telecast in A&E history.

On August 14, 2013, the Season 4 premiere drew a total of 11.8 million viewers, an increase of 37% vs. the season three premiere, drawing 6.3 million viewers in the Adults 25–54 demographic, making it the most watched nonfiction series telecast in cable television history. According to The Hollywood Reporter, the fourth season averaged 9.4 million viewers.

Duck Dynasty topped the list of celebrity/pop culture-themed costume searches on Yahoo! in October 2013, according to data compiled by Yahoo Web trend expert Carolyn Clark. As of October 17, 2014, the show has averaged 8.3 million viewers for 2014. According to an October 2014 release from E! Online, the majority of the series's Facebook audience is Republican. In 2016, The New York Times reported that Duck Dynasty "is the prototypical example of a show that is most popular in rural areas. The correlation between fandom and the percentage of people who voted for President Trump was higher ... than it was for any other" of the 50 shows with the most Facebook Likes. It was most popular in rural Texas, Arkansas, and Louisiana, and least popular in the Northeast US.

Seasonal ratings

Concerns 
Phil Robertson stated on Sports Spectrum, a Christian sports publication, that he confronted producers about editors of the show telling them not to say Jesus's name while praying at the end of episodes, and that they added intermittent bleep censors over random portions of the cast's unscripted dialogue although there was no profanity being spoken. Robertson cited the issues as part of what is often called "spiritual warfare", that there was no swearing that needed to be edited out, and the prayers were being censored to avoid offending non-Christian religious people. A&E did not comment on the claims.

A&E suspended Phil Robertson over remarks he made during an interview with Drew Magary  for GQ Magazine which had attracted outside criticism. During the interview for a featured article in GQ's January 2014 issue, titled What the Duck?, Magary asked Robertson: "What, in your mind, is sinful?" Robertson replied: "Start with homosexual behavior and just morph out from there. Bestiality, sleeping around with this woman and that woman and that woman and those men." A&E stated they were "extremely disappointed to have read Phil Robertson's comments in GQ, which are based on his own personal beliefs and are not reflected in the series Duck Dynasty". He said he is a "product of the '60s" but has since lived his life on Biblical principles. He added: "I would never treat anyone with disrespect just because they are different from me." The Robertson family released a statement about A&E's decision, refusing to do the show without him and supporting Phil by saying that while some of his comments were "coarse," his beliefs are "grounded in the teachings of the Bible." In the first public interview since the GQ interview, Robertson stood by his words and said: "Jesus will take sins away. If you're a homosexual, He'll take it away. If you're an adulterer, if you're a liar, what's the difference?" Robertson's remarks were reported in the media, with reactions split. Many social conservatives, including his corporate sponsors, some religious groups, and some Republican politicians including Sarah Palin, Bobby Jindal and Mike Huckabee, supported his right to such opinions. Robertson faced significant opposition from individuals viewing his comments as anti-gay and bigoted. A&E reversed Robertson's suspension. The network cited Phil and the family's regret for the use of "coarse language" in discussing body parts, and stated that A&E would launch a public service announcement across the channel's "entire portfolio" that would promote "tolerance and acceptance among all people." A Human Rights Campaign representative saw the reinstatement and message as a positive step, and "the real harm that such anti-gay and racist comments can cause" and the governor of Louisiana Bobby Jindal remarked on "tolerance of religious views".

Media franchise 

Duck Dynasty's success caused numerous spin-offs and expanded the media franchise for Duck Commander. This includes other television series, a music album, books, podcasts, and video games.

Awards and nominations

References

Further reading 
  `Duck Dynasty`'s Success Is Entirely Based on Selling a Fantasy - The enduring, commercial fallacy of the "authentic" man, The New Republic

External links 
 
 

2010s American reality television series
2012 American television series debuts
2017 American television series endings
A&E (TV network) original programming
English-language television shows
Ouachita Parish, Louisiana
2010s fads and trends
Robertson family
Louisiana culture
Television shows set in Louisiana
Conservative media in the United States